Abricots is a commune in the Jérémie Arrondissement, in the Grand'Anse department of Haiti. Its Taino-name was Mamey which means apricot the fruit. The town is nicknamed le Paradis des Indiens (Indian's Paradise).

Villages located within the municipality include: Abricots, Anse du Clerc, Anse Josep, L'Homond, Latitte, Louissant, Morne Bijote, Poyrette, Sajote, and Saint-Victor

References

Populated places in Grand'Anse (department)
Communes of Haiti